Maria Holst (1917–1980) was an Austrian film actress.

Selected filmography
 Invisible Opponent (1933)
 Court Theatre (1936)
 Operetta (1940)
 Vienna Blood (1942)
 Kiss Me Casanova (1949)
 The Trip to Marrakesh (1949)
 The Murder Trial of Doctor Jordan (1949)
 Chased by the Devil (1950)
 When the Evening Bells Ring (1951)
 The Heath Is Green (1951)
 Don't Ask My Heart (1952)
 A Thousand Red Roses Bloom (1952)
 We'll Talk About Love Later (1953)
 The Emperor Waltz (1953)
 Roses from the South (1954)
 Walking Back into the Past (1954)
 The Trapp Family (1956)
 A Heart Returns Home (1956)

References

External links
 

1917 births
1980 deaths
Austrian film actresses
Actresses from Vienna
20th-century Austrian actresses